Agyrium is a genus of saprophytic fungi in the family Agyriaceae.  It probably evolved from a lichen ancestor, as it is closely related to many lichenized species of fungi.

Taxonomy
Agyrium was first proposed by Elias Magnus Fries in his 1821 work Systema Mycologicum, although the name was not published validly as a type species was not indicated; Fries published the name validly a year later in the second volume of the same work. The species Agyrium rufum was assigned as the type by Frederic Clements and Cornelius Lott Shear in 1931.

Description
Characteristics of genus Agyrium include the following: a poorly developed thallus that is immersed in its substrate; ascomata in the form of an apothecium with a reduced ring-shaped exciple (the layer surrounding the hymenium that sometimes develops into a distinct margin); paraphyses that are highly branched; and ascospores that are ellipsoid and thin-walled.

The mycelia of Agyrium fungi, although not strictly lichenised, are associated with and sometimes penetrate green algae – particularly near the apothecia. This is a condition that has been described as "facultative parasitism".

Species
, Species Fungorum accepts two species of Agyrium. 
Agyrium aurantium 
Agyrium rufum 

The type species, Agyrium rufum, has a largely Northern Hemisphere distribution and occurs widely in Europe, although it has also been recorded in Tasmania. Agyrium aurantium occurs in China.

Although 46 taxa have been placed in Agyrium since its inception, many of them were described more than a century ago and have not been investigated with modern molecular techniques. Several of them have since been transferred to other genera. For example: 
Agyrium caesium  = Puttea caesia
Agyrium densum  = Mellitiosporiella densa
Agyrium flavescens  = Skyttella mulleri
Agyrium nigricans  = Platygloea nigricans
Agyrium nitidum  = Agyriella nitida
Agyrium phragmiticola  = Neottiosporina phragmiticola
Agyrium solidaginis  = Ploettnera solidaginis
Agyrium vulpinum  = Phacopsis vulpina

References

Pertusariales
Pertusariales genera
Taxa described in 1822
Taxa named by Elias Magnus Fries